The ActewAGL Canberra Classic is a golf tournament co-sanctioned by Australian Ladies Professional Golf Tour and the Ladies European Tour first played in 2009. It is played at the Royal Canberra Golf Club in Canberra, ACT, Australia. It is a 54-hole tournament played over three days, with a pro-am taking place the day before.

Winners

1=played over one round

References

External links
Coverage on the Australian Ladies Professional Golf's official site
Coverage on the Ladies European Tour's official site

ALPG Tour events
Ladies European Tour events
Golf tournaments in Australia
Recurring sporting events established in 2018
Summer events in Australia